Newcome is a surname. Notable people with the surname include:

People
Frederick Clive Newcome, (1847–1894), English Landscape painter, chiefly in watercolours
Henry Newcome (1627–1695), English nonconformist preacher and activist
James Newcome DL (born 1953), the current bishop of Carlisle in the Diocese of Carlisle
 John Newcome (politician) (died 1938), independent Irish politician
 John Newcome (academic) (died 1765), academic and priest
Peter Newcome (1715–1779), English educator and Fellow of the Royal Society
Peter Newcome (antiquary) (1727–1797), English cleric, known as an antiquarian
Richard Newcome (1701–1769), English bishop of Llandaff and bishop of St Asaph
Susanna Newcome (1685–1763), English theologian
Thomas Warren Newcome (1923–2011), American lawyer, judge, and politician
William Newcome (1729–1800), Englishman and cleric of the Church of Ireland
William Newcome (cricketer) (1813–1897), English clergyman and a cricketer
Newcome Cappe (1733–1800), English unitarian divine

See also
Colonel Newcome, the Perfect Gentleman, a 1920 British silent historical drama film
Daniel T. Newcome Double House, also known as Brady Manor, on the Brady Street Hill in Davenport, Iowa, United States
Colonel Newcome (play), 1906 play by the British writer Michael Morton
Newcombe, surname
Newcomb (disambiguation)
Newcomen (disambiguation)
Newcomer (disambiguation)